Michael Hilton Jr. (born March 9, 1994) is an American football cornerback for the Cincinnati Bengals of the National Football League (NFL). He played college football at Ole Miss and signed with the Jacksonville Jaguars as an undrafted free agent in 2016. Hilton has also been a member of the New England Patriots and Pittsburgh Steelers.

College career

2012
Hilton began attending the University of Mississippi in 2012. After sitting out the Rebels' season-opener against Central Arkansas, Hilton made his collegiate debut in Week 2 against UTEP. He recorded his first two career tackles the following week as Ole Miss lost to Texas. Hilton made his first career start on October 6, 2012, against Texas A&M, finishing with three solo tackles, a forced fumble, and two sacks of Aggies quarterback Johnny Manziel as the Rebels lost 27–30. In Week 8, he recorded a season-high six combined tackles and had the first two pass deflections of his career, helping the Rebels defeat Arkansas 30–27. He played in 12 games as a freshman, starting four and finishing with 33 combined tackles, 3.5 tackles for a loss, two sacks, two pass deflections, and two forced fumbles.

2013
Hilton started the Ole Miss Rebels' season-opener against Vanderbilt at their "Huskie" position (hybrid strong safety). He finished the 39–35 victory with five total tackles, two of which were for a loss. On October 5, 2013, he collected a season-high eight combined tackles during a 22–30 loss to Auburn. On November 16, 2013, Hilton made his first career interception to go along with four combined tackles as the Rebels defeated Troy 51–21. He finished the season with 52 combined tackles (37 solo), 5.5 tackles for a loss, four pass deflections, a sack, and a forced fumble in 11 games and 11 starts.

2014
In the Ole Miss Rebels' season-opening 35–13 victory over Boise State, Hilton recorded a season-high nine combined tackles. On September 13, 2014, he collected four combined tackles, deflected a pass, and made his first interception of the season in a 56–15 victory over Louisiana-Lafayette. On October 25, 2014, he accumulated eight combined tackles and made his third interception of the season in a 7–10 loss to #24 LSU. Hilton finished his junior season with career-high 71 combined tackles (48 solo), four tackles for a loss, three interceptions, and seven pass deflections in 13 starts and 13 games. He led the team with 71 tackles and started 11 games at cornerback and two games as rover.

2015
As a senior, Hilton was given the #38 jersey This number holds special significance at Ole Miss and is only given to a select player who embodies the spirit of former Rebels defensive back Chucky Mullins, who in 1989 became paralyzed after making a head-first tackle that shattered four vertebrae in his cervical spine.

In a 73–22 victory over Fresno State in Week 2, Hilton collected six combined tackles (one for a loss), a forced fumble, and half a sack while starting at rover. On October 10, 2015, he recorded four combined tackles (three for a loss), a pass deflection, and his first interception of the season in a 52–3 victory over New Mexico State. The following week, the Rebels were defeated by Memphis with Hilton making a career-high 11 combined tackles, 2.5 tackles for a loss, one sack, a pass deflection, and an interception. He finished his senior season with 70 combined tackles (49 solo), 12.5 tackles for a loss, 11 pass deflections, 1.5 sacks, and two interceptions in 11 starts and 13 games.

Hilton finished his college career with 226 combined tackles (156 solo), 25.5 tackles for a loss, 24 pass deflections, six interceptions, four forced fumbles, and 3.5 sacks in 49 games and 39 starts.

Professional career
Coming out of Ole Miss, Hilton was projected to go undrafted and be a priority free agent by the majority of NFL draft experts and scouts. He did not receive an invitation to the NFL Combine and attended Ole Miss' pro day on March 28, 2016. Team representatives and scouts from all 32 NFL teams were present at Ole Miss' pro day to scout one of the most talented groups in school history, one that included Hilton, Laquon Treadwell, Laremy Tunsil, Robert Nkemdiche, Cody Core, Chad Kelly, Evan Engram, Fahn Cooper and ten other prospects. He was ranked as the 27th-best free safety prospect in the draft by NFLDraftScout.com. Hilton received positive reviews from scouts for his versatile ability to play multiple positions in college, decent coverage skills, gritty tackling ability, reaction quickness, and ability to track balls well downfield. NFL scouts thought his ability to produce a professional career was greatly hindered by his lack of size.

Jacksonville Jaguars
On May 1, 2016, Hilton was signed as an undrafted free agent by the Jacksonville Jaguars following the 2016 NFL Draft.

Throughout training camp, Hilton competed with Aaron Colvin, Dwayne Gratz, Peyton Thompson, Josh Johnson, Demetrius McCray, Briean Boddy-Calhoun, and Nick Marshall for a job as a backup cornerback. On August 29, 2016, the Jacksonville Jaguars released Hilton as a part of their final roster cuts.

New England Patriots
On September 6, 2016, Hilton was signed to the Patriots' practice squad. He was released by the team on September 14, 2016.

Pittsburgh Steelers
On December 13, 2016, Hilton was signed to the Steelers' practice squad. He signed a reserve/future contract with the Steelers on January 24, 2017. He reunited with his former teammate Senquez Golson whom he played with and backed up at Ole Miss.

2017
Hilton entered training camp competing with William Gay and Senquez Golson for the job as the starting nickelback. Hilton was named the starting nickelback to begin the regular season.

He made his regular season debut during the Steelers' 17–18 season-opening victory over the Cleveland Browns and finished the game with two combined tackles. The following week, he earned his first career start and recorded a season-high nine combined tackles during a 26–9 victory over the Minnesota Vikings. On October 1, 2017, Hilton collected four solo tackles, earned his first career sack, and made his first career interception off of Baltimore Ravens quarterback Joe Flacco during the Steelers' 26–9 victory. On December 25, 2017, Hilton recorded six solo tackles as well as three sacks on Houston Texans' quarterbacks T. J. Yates and Taylor Heinicke during the Steelers' 34–6 victory, earning him AFC Defensive Player of the Week honors. Hilton finished the season with 64 combined tackles (48 solo), six pass deflections, four sacks, and two interceptions in 16 games and four starts. Hilton received an overall grade of 83.6 from Pro Football Focus, which ranked as the 28th-best grade among all cornerbacks in 2017.

2018

Hilton changed his jersey number from No. 31 to No. 28 after it became available when Sean Davis and Joe Haden also changed numbers. Head coach Mike Tomlin retained Hilton as the primary nickelback to begin the regular season and also named him the fifth backup cornerback, behind Joe Haden, Artie Burns, Coty Sensabaugh, and Cameron Sutton. On September 24, 2018, Hilton made five combined tackles, a pass deflection, and an interception during a 30-27 win at the Tampa Bay Buccaneers. Hilton sustained an elbow injury during the game and was subsequently inactive for the Steelers’ Week 4 loss against the Baltimore Ravens. In Week 14, he collected a season-high eight combined tackles during a 24-21 loss at the Oakland Raiders. He finished the season with 57 combined tackles (44 solo), eight pass deflections, one sack, and one interception in 15 games and two starts. He received an overall grade of 69.9 from Pro Football Focus, which ranked as the 43rd-best grade among cornerbacks in 2018.

2019
In Week 5 against the Baltimore Ravens, Hilton recorded his first interception of the season off Lamar Jackson in the 23–26 overtime loss. In Week 8 against the Miami Dolphins, Hilton forced a fumble on running back Mark Walton which was recovered by teammate Steven Nelson in the 27–14 win. In Week 15 against the Buffalo Bills, Hilton recovered a fumble forced by teammate T. J. Watt on running back Devin Singletary during the 10–17 loss.

2020
On March 18, 2020, the Steelers placed a second-round restricted free agent tender on Hilton. He signed the tender on June 12, 2020.

In Week 2 against the Denver Broncos, Hilton led the team with eight tackles, recorded his first sack of the season on Jeff Driskel, and recovered a fumble during the 26–21 win.
In Week 3 against the Houston Texans, Hilton recorded his first interception of the season off a pass thrown by Deshaun Watson during the 28–21 win.
In Week 5 against the Philadelphia Eagles, Hilton again led the team with eight tackles and sacked Carson Wentz once during the 38–29 win.
In Week 14 against the Buffalo Bills, Hilton intercepted a pass thrown by Josh Allen and forced a fumble on Dawson Knox that was recovered by the Steelers during the 15–26 loss. 
In Week 16 against the Indianapolis Colts, Hilton recovered a fumble lost by Philip Rivers and intercepted a pass thrown by Rivers late in the fourth quarter to secure a 28–24 win for the Steelers.
Hilton earned the AFC Defensive Player of the Week award for his performance in Week 16.

Cincinnati Bengals
Hilton signed a four-year, $24 million contract with the Cincinnati Bengals on March 19, 2021. In Week 12 against his former team, the Pittsburgh Steelers, he returned an interception 24 yards for his first career touchdown in a 41–10 rout.

References

External links
Pittsburgh Steelers bio
Ole Miss Rebels bio

1994 births
Living people
African-American players of American football
American football cornerbacks
Cincinnati Bengals players
Jacksonville Jaguars players
New England Patriots players
Ole Miss Rebels football players
People from Fayetteville, Georgia
People from Tyrone, Georgia
Pittsburgh Steelers players
Players of American football from Georgia (U.S. state)
Sportspeople from the Atlanta metropolitan area
21st-century African-American sportspeople